Gonzalo Justo Facio Segreda (28 March 1918 – 24 January 2018) was a Costa Rican lawyer, politician, and diplomat. 

Facio was born in San José on 28 March 1918 to Gonzalo Facio Ulloa and María Teresa Segreda Solera.

He studied law at the University of Costa Rica and New York University. He served on the Founding Junta of the Second Republic and was a founding member of the National Liberation Party. Between 1953 and 1956, he was President of the Legislative Assembly of Costa Rica. 

Facio first became Costa Rican ambassador to the United States in 1956, and held the post for two years. He returned to the position in 1962, serving through 1966. He was named foreign minister in 1970, and was succeeded by Rafael Ángel Calderón Fournier in 1978. From 1990 to 1994, he was again ambassador to the United States. In 1998, he was appointed ambassador to Mexico, and stepped down in 2001.

He was married three times. He had three children (Sandra, Alda and Rómulo) from his first wife María Lilia Montejo Ortuño. From his second wife, Ana Franco Calzia, he had three more children (Ana Catalina, Giannina and Carla). From his third wife Julia Nubia Salmerón Mejía he had no offspring.    

Facio died at the age of 99 on 24 January 2018 in Escazu.

References

1918 births
2018 deaths
Foreign ministers of Costa Rica
Presidents of the Legislative Assembly of Costa Rica
Ambassadors of Costa Rica to the United States
Ambassadors of Costa Rica to Mexico
20th-century Costa Rican lawyers
University of Costa Rica alumni
New York University School of Law alumni
National Liberation Party (Costa Rica) politicians
People from San José, Costa Rica